McGlashan is a surname. Notable people with the surname include:

Alan McGlashan, MC (1898–1997), British pilot and doctor
Alastair Robin McGlashan (died 2012), Anglican priest, a Jungian analyst, Tamil scholar
Alexander McGlashan (c. 1740 – 1797), Scottish violinist
Charles McGlashan, former member of Marin County Board of Supervisors, California
Charles Fayette McGlashan (1847–1931), American lawyer, writer, sinophobe, entomologist
Colin McGlashan (born 1964), former Scottish football striker
Don McGlashan (born 1959), New Zealand musician and songwriter
Edward McGlashan (1817–1889), Member of Parliament in Dunedin, Otago, New Zealand
Hamish McGlashan (born 1963), Australian rower
Jermaine McGlashan (born 1988), English footballer
John McGlashan (footballer) (1967–2018), Scottish football player and manager
John McGlashan (politician) (1802–1864), New Zealand lawyer, politician, public servant and educationalist
Peter McGlashan (born 1979), cricketer who has represented New Zealand
Peter A.S. McGlashan (1831–1908), Confederate officer during the American Civil War
Rosco McGlashan (Born 1950), Australian drag racing record-holder, holder of the Australian land speed record
Sara McGlashan (born 1982), New Zealand cricketer
Stewart McGlashan (1807–1873) sculptor
Thomas McGlashan (born 1942), American professor of psychiatry at Yale University
Ximena McGlashan (1893–1986), American entomologist

See also
John McGlashan College, in the suburb of Maori Hill in Dunedin, New Zealand
McGlashan Air Machine Gun, training weapon capable of firing BBs
McGlashan Coin Shooting Pistol, introduced in 1945 by the McGlashan Air Machine Gun Company, Los Angeles, California
McGlashan Everist, Australian architectural partnership